Esamirim chionides is a species of beetle in the family Cerambycidae. It was described by Bates in 1885. It is known from Panama and Costa Rica.

References

Hemilophini
Beetles described in 1885